Rebecca Reynolds-Knight (born May 31, 1949) is an American politician in the state of Iowa.

Reynolds was born in Evanston, Illinois and attended Valley College in California. A Democrat, she served in the Iowa House of Representatives from 1997 to 2002 (94th district).

References

1949 births
Living people
People from Evanston, Illinois
Businesspeople from Iowa
Women state legislators in Iowa
Democratic Party members of the Iowa House of Representatives
20th-century American politicians
21st-century American politicians
20th-century American women politicians
21st-century American women politicians